I Am Guilty is a 1921 American silent drama film directed by Jack Nelson and starring Louise Glaum, Mahlon Hamilton, and Claire Du Brey.

Synopsis
A lawyer defends his own wife, a former chorus girl, who has been accused of murder.

Cast
 Louise Glaum as Connie MacNair 
 Mahlon Hamilton as Robert MacNair 
 Claire Du Brey as Trixie 
 Joseph Kilgour as Teddy Garrick 
 Ruth Stonehouse as London Hattie 
 May Hopkins as Molly May 
 George Cooper as Dillon 
 Michael D. Moore as The Child 
 Frederick Ko Vert as The Dancer

Preservation
With no copies of I Am Guilty located in any film archives, it is a lost film.

References

Bibliography
 Munden, Kenneth White. The American Film Institute Catalog of Motion Pictures Produced in the United States, Part 1. University of California Press, 1997.

External links

1921 films
1921 drama films
American silent feature films
American black-and-white films
Films directed by Jack Nelson
1920s English-language films
1920s American films
Silent American drama films